Tonight's the Night is a jukebox musical based on the songs of British singer Rod Stewart with a book by Ben Elton. It opened in October 2003 at the Victoria Palace Theatre, and ran for just over a year.

A scaled down version of the musical toured the UK between February and July 2006, commencing at the Palace Theatre, Manchester.  It was directed by C. Jay Ranger, with new sets, lighting, sound and costumes.

Original creative team
 Music and lyrics: Rod Stewart and others
 Book and direction: Ben Elton
 Choreography: Stephen Mear
 Music supervisor/dance arrangements: Gareth Valentine
 Set and costume Design: Lez Brotherston
 Lighting design: Mark Henderson
 Sound design: Rory Madden/Whizz
 Orchestrator: Colin Towns
 Casting: Pippa Ailion
 Producer: Phil McIntyre
 Producer: Arnold Stiefel
 Associates: Paul Roberts, Michael Watt, Michael Coppel

Original London cast
 Stuart Clutterbuck: Tim Howar
 Sweet Lady Mary: Dianne Pilkington
 Satan: Hannah Waddingham
 Baby Jane Golden: Catherine Porter
 Stoner: Michael McKell
 Rocky Washington: Tim Funnell
 Dee Dee: Debbie Kurup
 Jorgė: Howard Samuels
 Greaser: Keith Bookman
 Bonehead: Jeff Edwards
 Winona: Sharon Clancy
 Travolta: Tim Walton
 Bootie: Rebecca Parker
 Loretta: Tanya Robb
 Ensemble: Thern Reynolds, Tyman Boatwright, Matthew Boulton, Daniel Delaney, Lucie Fentum, Matt Firth, Emma Gray, Leon Maurice-Jones, Samantha Modeste, Jo Morris, Brenda Jane Newhouse, Ngo Ngofa, Chris Stanton, Dean Street
 Swings: Lucy Jane Adcock, Jane McMurtrie, Darragh O'Leary, Tino Sanchez, Paul Shipp
 Dance Captain: Sarah Dickens

2006 UK tour creative team
 Music and lyrics: Rod Stewart and others
 Book: Ben Elton
 Director: C. Jay Ranger
 Choreography: Denise Ranger
 Music supervisor/director: Griff Johnson
 Set design: Andrew Howe-Davies
 Costume design: Shereen Hibbert
 Lighting design: Adam Bassett
 Sound design: Rory Madden/Whizz/Glenn Beckley
 Casting: Pippa Ailion
 Producer: Phil McIntyre
 Producer: Arnola Stiefel
 Associates: Paul Roberts

2006 UK tour cast
 Stuart Clutterbuck: Ryan Molloy
 Mary: Rachel Tucker
 Satan/Baby Jane Golden: Tiffany Graves
 Stoner: Jeff Edwards
 Rocky: Daniel Robinson
 Dee Dee: Kristina Paraskeva
 Jorgė: Nathaniel Robinson
 Greaser: Stepps
 Understudy Stuart: George Maguire
 Understudy Mary: Rachael Wood
 Ensemble: Jon Hawkins, Ian Male, Sam Attwater, Stephen Uppal, Rebecca Bainbridge, Rachael Wood, Stepps, George Maguire, Francesca Jackson, Faye Raye Robertson, Chloe Bell, Victoria Harrington
 Dance Captain: Stepps
 Resident Director: Stepps

2006 UK tour crew 
 Production manager: Gordon Isaacs
 Company stage manager: Jerry Gunn
 Deputy stage manager: James Hayden
 Assistant stage managers: Leanne Fagan, Martyn Sands
 Chief LX: Nico Bray
 Deputy electrician: Philip Rowe
 Assistant electrician: Vanessa Lucas (was Marsh)
 No 1 sound: Glenn Beckley
 No 2 sound: Aidan Cloney
 No 3 sound: Noel Baum
 Production rigger: Nipper Finch
 Touring carpenter : Dave Edmunds
 Assistant touring carpenter: Jason Culverwell
 Head of wardrobe: Sue Casey
 Wardrobe assistant: Chris Hayward

2006 UK tour band 
 Musical director/Keys 1: Griff Johnson
 Keys 2: Simon Carr-Minns
 Lead guitar: [unknown]
 Rhythm guitar: [unknown]
 Drums: Matt Bayne / Goran Stajic
 Bass guitar: Glen Muscroft
 Transport: Paul Mathew Transport
 Lighting hire: Whitelight Ltd.
 Sound hire: Sonalyst

External links
Phil McIntyre Entertainment, Tonights The Night, UK Tour, 2006.
This Is Theatre, Tonights The Night, UK Tour, Tour Dates, 2006.
Adam Bassett Design, Lighting Designer, 2011.
Sonalyst, Sound Hire, Rory Madden, 2011.

2003 musicals
West End musicals
Rod Stewart
Jukebox musicals
British musicals